The sacral spinal nerve 1 (S1) is a spinal nerve of the sacral segment.

It originates from the spinal column from below the 1st body of the sacrum

Muscles
S1 supplies many muscles, either directly or through nerves originating from S1. They are not innervated with S1 as single origin, but partly by S1 and partly by other spinal nerves. The muscles are:
 gluteus maximus muscle 
 gluteus medius muscle
 gluteus minimus muscle 
 tensor fasciae latae 
 piriformis
 obturator internus muscle 
 inferior gemellus 
 superior gemellus
 quadratus femoris
 semitendinosus
 gastrocnemius
 flexor hallucis longus
 abductor digiti minimi
 quadratus plantae

Additional Images

References

Spinal nerves